Albertina Berkenbrock (11 April 1919 – 15 June 1931) was a Brazilian Roman Catholic from Brazil killed "in defensum castitatis" in 1931 after she refused her attacker's rape attempts. Berkenbrock was of German descent both sides and she worked on her farm while also teaching fellow children catechism and attending Mass on a frequent basis.

Berkenbrock's beatification cause came to fruition with the beatification held on 20 October 2007.

Life
Albertina Berkenbrock was born in Imaruí in Brazil on 11 April 1919 to the devout farmers Johann Hermann and Elisabeth Schmöller as one of nine children. Her grandparents immigrated from Schöppingen to Brazil and brought with them their three children one of who was Johann Hermann.

Berkenbrock was baptized on 25 May 1919 and received her Confirmation on 9 March 1925. On 16 August 1928 she made her First Communion which was an experience that she herself described as the most beautiful event in her entire life. Berkenbrock also fostered a special devotion to the Mother of God and to Aloysius Gonzaga who was the patron saint of São Luís. Her teachers praised her morals and her generous nature and she never retaliated against those that teased her or taunted her like her brothers sometimes did as siblings do.

Maneco Palhoça, who worked for her father, tried to rape her on 15 June 1931. Berkenbrock searched for a bullock that ran off and came across Maneco who was loading beans into a cart; she asked if he had seen it and so Maneco pointed her in the wrong direction to a wooded area so he could attack her. The girl followed his directions and heard twigs cracking believing it was the bullock but was petrified to see Maneco behind her. Berkenbrock tried to fight back but her attacker realized that he would fail and she would point him out so grasped her hair and slit her throat with a knife. He tried to cover up his crime but was soon arrested after people suspected him; each time Maneco was taken near the girl's corpse the blood from her neck gushed as a sign he was the culprit. He confessed to his crime as well as two other previous murders. He was tried and convicted in which he was given a life sentence. In prison he admitted to his fellow prisoners that he murdered the girl because she resisted his rape attempts. Her remains were later relocated in 2002.

Beatification
The beatification process opened in Tubarão in an informative process that spanned from 30 December 1954 until its closure later in 2001; the Congregation for the Causes of Saints validated this process in Rome on 18 January 2002. The cause commenced on a formal level under Pope John Paul II on 2 October 2001 and Berkenbrock was titled as a Servant of God. The C.C.S. received the official Positio dossier from the postulation in 2002 for assessment. Theologians approved the cause on 26 September 2006 as did the C.C.S. on 21 November 2006 while Pope Benedict XVI approved that Berkenbrock was killed "in defensum castitatis" on 16 December 2006 and thus approved her beatification.

Cardinal José Saraiva Martins presided over the beatification on the pope's behalf in Brazil on 20 October 2007.

The current postulator for the cause is Paolo Vilotta.

References

External links
Official website 
Hagiography Circle
Catholic Fire
Saints SQPN

1919 births
1931 deaths
20th-century Roman Catholic martyrs
20th-century venerated Christians
20th-century Brazilian people
Beatifications by Pope Benedict XVI
Brazilian beatified people
Brazilian people of German descent
Incidents of violence against girls
Roman Catholic child blesseds
Deaths by blade weapons

Murdered Brazilian children
People from Santa Catarina (state)
People murdered in Brazil
Rape in Brazil